Yevhen Kapaiev ( (born September 12, 1984) is a professional Ukrainian volleyball player and captain of the Lokomotyv Kharkiv in Ukrainian Super League.

Career
In July 2017 Kapaiev returned to the Lokomotyv Kharkiv.

Sporting achievements

Clubs 
Ukrainian Championship:
  2005, 2007, 2009, 2010, 2011, 2012, 2013, 2014
Ukrainian Cup:
  2006, 2007, 2008, 2009, 2010, 2011, 2012, 2013, 2014

References

External links

1984 births
Living people
Sportspeople from Makiivka
Ukrainian men's volleyball players
VC Lokomotyv Kharkiv players